Shooting Creek Township is a township and one of the six townships of Clay County, North Carolina, United States, and is the easternmost of the six. The other five are: Brasstown, Hayesville, Sweetwater, Hiawassee, and Tusquittee.

References

Townships in Clay County, North Carolina
Townships in North Carolina